BIR TV or BIR Televizija is Bosnian commercial cable/IPTV television channel based in Sarajevo operated by Islamic Community of Bosnia and Herzegovina. The headquarters of Radio and Television of the Islamic Community of Bosnia and Herzegovina - BIR is located in the building of the Gazi Husrev-bey's Library in Sarajevo (Gazi Husrev-begova 56A).

TV station was established on 24 April 2020 which was also the first day of Ramadan and it broadcasts religious and educational program. Program is mainly produced in the Bosnian language in high definition.

Beside BIR TV HD, Islamic Community of Bosnia and Herzegovina is, via Media centar d.o.o. Sarajevo, also owner of Preporod weekly newspapers, Islamic radio station - Radio BIR, MINA News agency and Preporod.info website.

See also

 Radio BIR
 MTV Igman
 Televizija 5

References

External links

 Official website of BIR TV 
 Official website of IC BiH Media Centar
 Official website  of Communications Regulatory Agency of Bosnia and Herzegovina

Mass media in Sarajevo
Television stations in Bosnia and Herzegovina
Television channels and stations established in 2020
Islamic television networks